There are two main translations of the Bible into Japanese widely in use today—the New Interconfessional Version (新共同訳聖書) and the New Japanese Bible (新改訳聖書). New Interconfessional Translation Version is published by the Japan Bible Society and the New Japanese Bible is published by Inochinokotoba-sha(いのちのことば社). The New Japanese Version aims to be used as a literal translation using modern Japanese while the New Interconfessional Version aims to be ecumenically used by all Christian denominations and must therefore conform to various theologies. Protestant Evangelicals most often use the New Japanese Version, but the New Interconfessional Version is the most widely distributed and the one used by the Catholic Church, the United Church of Christ, Lutheran Church factions and many Anglicans in Japan.

Jesuit missions
Japanese Bible translation began when Catholic missionaries (Kirishitan) entered Japan in 1549, and Jesuits published portions of the New Testament in Kyoto, in 1613, though no copy survives. Exactly how much was translated by the Jesuit Mission is not confirmed. It would seem that at least Gospels for the Sundays of the year and other Bible pericopes were translated. Shortly afterwards, however, Christianity was banned and all the missionaries were exiled. That translation of the Bible is now lost.

Protestant missionaries
Work on translation started outside Japan in the 19th century by Protestant missionaries interested in Japan. Karl Gutzlaff of the London Missionary Society translated the Gospel of John in Macau in 1837, referring to the Chinese version of Robert Morrison (Chinese Shentian Shengshu 神天聖書). Bernard Jean Bettelheim, who had been a missionary in the Ryūkyū Kingdom (Okinawa) and who had been exiled, translated the Bible to Ryūkyūan and published the Gospel of Luke and John, Acts of the Apostles and the Epistle to the Romans in Hong Kong in 1855. Japan re-opened in 1858, and many missionaries came into the country. They found that intellectuals could read Chinese texts easily, so they used Chinese Bibles at first. However, the proportion of intellectuals was only in the region of 2% and in order to spread their religion across the country more effectively, a Japanese Bible became necessary.

A bilingual version of the Gospel of Luke was published in 1858. Intended for missionary use in Japan, it contained a revision of Bettelheim's Luke next to the Chinese Delegates' Bible version. Due to its heavy Ryūkyūan flavor it proved just as unsuitable as Chinese-only Bibles. After immigrating to the United States, Bettelheim continued work on his translations, and newly revised editions of Luke, John, and the Acts, now closer to Japanese than Ryūkyūan, were published posthumously in Vienna in 1873–1874 with the assistance of August Pfizmaier.

Meiji Original Version, 1887

A translation was done by James Curtis Hepburn, of the Presbyterian Mission, and Samuel Robbins Brown, of the Reformed Church of America. It is presumed that Japanese intellectual assistants helped translate Bridgman and Culbertson's Chinese Bible (1861) into Japanese, and Hepburn and Brown adjusted the phrases. The Gospels of Mark, Matthew and John were published in 1872. Hepburn's project was taken over by a Missionary Committee, sponsored by the American Bible Society, British and Foreign Bible Society and the Scottish Bible Society in Tokyo. Their New Testament and Old Testament, called the Meiji Original Version (明治元訳聖書 meiji genyaku seisho, "Meiji era Original Translation of Scripture"), was published in 1880 and 1887 respectively. They translated from a Greek text as well as the King James Version.

Taisho Revised Version, 1917
A revision of the New Testament, the Taisho Revised Version (大正改訳聖書 taisho kaiyaku seisho, "Taisho era Revised Translation of Scripture") appeared in 1917 during the Taishō period. This version was widely read even outside of Christian society. Its phrases are pre-modern style, but became popular in Japan. This was based on the Nestle-Åland Greek Text and the English Revised Version (RV).

Bible, Japanese Colloquial, 1954, 1955, 1975, 1984, 2002
After World War II, the  translated the "". The New Testament being ready in 1954 and the Old Testament in 1955. It was adopted by certain Protestant churches but never became really popular, perhaps because of its poor literary style. This translation was based on the Revised Standard Version (RSV).

Japanese Living Bible, 1977, 1993, 2016
Based on the Living Bible this translation has an informal literary style which attempts to capture the meaning of the original texts in modern Japanese. Revised version released in 2016 by Word of Life press.

1977 version available online in PDF form from Biblica and at bible.com

New Japanese Bible, 1965, 1970, 1978, 2003, 2017
The Shin Kaiyaku endeavors to translate theologically difficult passages in a way that is linguistically accurate to the source texts, to strike a balance between word-for-word and thought-for-thought but erring toward a literal translation.

The latest edition was released in 2017.

New Interconfessional Translation/Interconfessional Version, 1987, 1988, 2018
The Second Vatican Council decided to promote ecumenism and emphasized respect for the Bible. Consortia between the Catholic and the Protestant churches were organized and translation projects started in many countries, including Japan. It has been distributed well by various organisations such as Gideons International, the next edition was planned to be released in 2016.

After inconsistencies throughout the 1987 text were pointed out and the public expressed interest in a revision in order to improve it, the board of directors of the Japan Bible Society officially decided in 2009 to undertake the revision of the New Interconfessional Translation Bible, the first revision in 31 years. On 2 March 2010, they held a press conference to announce the start of the translation project. Taking advantage of the Skopos theory of translation, it seeks to serve the "next generation" of Christians while presenting the text in a "dignified Japanese suitable for reading in worship."

Other translators
There are many other Japanese translations of the Bible by various organizations and individuals.

Catholic versions
In the Catholic Church, Emile Raguet of the MEP translated the New Testament from the Vulgate Latin version and published it in 1910. It was treated as the standard text by Japanese Catholics. Federico Barbaro colloquialized it (published in 1957). He went on to translate the Old Testament in 1964.

The Franciscans completed a translation of the whole Bible, based on the Greek and Hebrew text, in 1978. This project was inspired by the Jerusalem Bible.

Orthodox versions

In the Eastern Orthodox Church, Nicholas and Tsugumaro Nakai translated the New Testament as an official text in 1901, but the 1954 Colloquial Translation is often used.

The Japanese Orthodox Bible, of course, describes the Orthodox Yasuyuki Takahashi as "the most credible Bible that can be used regardless of the religion", but even Protestant missionaries in the Meiji era have apostles. Some have described the Gospels of the Book and John as "much better than any translation currently in existence".

Some people don't appreciate the style very much like the Protestant Fujihara Fujio, but in the modern Bible, etc., it is described as an accurate translation. On the other hand, it is true that this translation is difficult, and in the 1930s, orthodox people called for revision. However, Nikolai himself should raise the understanding of the believers toward the translation by having the Orthodox teachings understood correctly, and on the contrary, he was opposed to damaging the accuracy of the translation by asking the public.

Jehovah's Witnesses, 1973, 1985, 2019
Japanese was among the first 8 languages into which the New World Translation was translated. Jehovah's Witnesses first released the Japanese New World Translation as 「クリスチャン･ギリシャ語聖書 新世界訳」 (New World Translation of the Christian Greek Scriptures) in 1973. This Bible, however, contains Christian Greek Scriptures only. By 1982, the first complete Bible was finally released in Japanese and it is called as 新世界訳聖書 (New World Translation of the Holy Scriptures). By the same year, tens of thousands of copies had been printed in Japan printery. Not long after, in 1985, another edition of the Japanese New World translation was released, this release also includes the new Reference Bible. Both the Standard and Reference edition of this Bible is based from the English 1984 edition of the New World Translation of the Holy Scriptures which was released on 1984 in United States.

After several years since the released in 1985, on 13 April 2019, a member of the Governing Body of Jehovah's Witnesses, Stephen Lett, released the revised edition of the New World Translation of the Holy Scriptures with a same name—新世界訳聖書 in Japanese. This new Bible is based from the English 2013 revision of the New World Translation of the Holy Scriptures which was released at the 129th annual meeting of the Watch Tower Bible and Tract Society of Pennsylvania. This revised edition in Japanese includes the use of more modern and understandable language (look at the chart below), clarified Biblical expression, appendixes, and many more.

Comparison

References

External links
Downloadable
 Japanese Bible Download 日本のバイブル, at Downloadbibles/Japanese
Online
 Classical 文語訳, at ibibles.net
 Colloquial 口語訳, at ibibles.net
 Colloquial, 1955 edition, at Bible.is
 New Interconfessional Version, at Bible.is
 New World Translation, at JW.ORG
Orthodox church Translation

Japanese
Christianity in Japan
Japanese literature